Hartington Town Quarter is a civil parish in the Derbyshire Dales district of Derbyshire, England.  The parish contains 39 listed buildings that are recorded in the National Heritage List for England.  Of these, one is listed at Grade II*, the middle of the three grades, and the others are at Grade II, the lowest grade.  The parish contains the village of Hartington and the surrounding countryside.  Most of the listed buildings are houses, cottages, farmhouses, and associated structures.  The other listed buildings include a church, hotels and public houses, a bridge, two mileposts, and a war memorial.


Key

Buildings

References

Citations

Sources

 

 

Lists of listed buildings in Derbyshire